James III may refer to:

 James III of Cyprus (1473–1474)
 James III of Majorca (c. 1315–1349)
 James III of Scotland (1451–1488)
 James III, Margrave of Baden-Hachberg (1562–1590)
 James Francis Edward Stuart (1688–1766), pretender who styled himself James III of England and Ireland, and James VIII of Scotland